Mariana Eleanor Gosnell (October 28, 1932 – March 23, 2012) was an artist, journalist, photographer, pilot and book author originally from Columbus, Ohio.

Biography
Gosnell graduated cum laude with a Bachelor of Fine Arts from Ohio Wesleyan University and also spent time at the Sorbonne in Paris. She worked for Newsweek for twenty-five years, as medicine and science reporter and editor, additionally contributing to Smithsonian and National Wildlife.

She died of cancer in March 2012.

In July 2016, a New York Times journalist live-streamed the discovery of some slide photographs by the side of a New York City trash can, and in course of time discovered them to be Gosnell's original photographs. The story was picked up by several online publications.

Works
Zero Three Bravo: Solo Across America in a Small Plane. Touchstone, 1994.
Ice: The Nature, the History, and the Uses of an Astonishing Substance. University of Chicago Press, 2005.

References

Further reading
Review of "Ice" in the New York Times

1932 births
2012 deaths
American science journalists
American women journalists
American women writers
Newsweek people
Ohio Wesleyan University alumni
Science writers
21st-century American women